Henri Willem "Harry" van Doorn (6 October 1915 – 12 January 1992) was a Dutch politician of the Catholic People's Party (KVP) and later co-founder of the Political Party of Radicals (PPR).

Decorations

References

External links

Official
  Mr. H.W. (Harry) van Doorn Parlement & Politiek

1915 births
1992 deaths
Catholic People's Party politicians
Chairmen of the Catholic People's Party
Commanders of the Order of Orange-Nassau
20th-century Dutch judges
Dutch nonprofit directors
Dutch prosecutors
Dutch people of World War II
Dutch political party founders
Dutch public broadcasting administrators
Dutch Roman Catholics
Knights of the Holy Sepulchre
Knights of the Order of the Netherlands Lion
Leiden University alumni
Members of the House of Representatives (Netherlands)
Ministers of Social Work of the Netherlands
Ministers of Sport of the Netherlands
People from Amersfoort
Politicians from The Hague
Political Party of Radicals politicians
20th-century Dutch civil servants
20th-century Dutch politicians